Michael E. Laycock is a Canadian retired ice hockey goaltender who was an All-American for Brown.

Career
Laycock began attending Brown University in 1975 and backed-up the Bears' starter Kevin McCabe for his first two seasons. Despite seeing relatively little playing time, he was drafted in the 12th round of the 1977 NHL Draft. The following season he made the transition into the starting role and starred for the team. Brown finished 6th in the ECAC Hockey standings and was one of the top defensive teams in the conference. He was named an All-American that season and recorded the Bears' first shutout in four years.

In Laycock's senior season the team didn't see much success but he was still held in high regard. Laycock received two team awards, one for being the senior who had most improved over his career and another for academic excellence. After graduating with a degree in economics, Laycock played one game of professional hockey before retiring and beginning his career as an accountant. He wasn't completely through with the game, however, and appeared in senior hockey games in the 1980s. Laycock spent his professional career working for BDO Dunwody, eventually becoming a partner with the firm.

Laycock was inducted into the Brown athletic Hall of Fame in 1989.

Statistics

Regular season and playoffs

Awards and honors

References

External links

1957 births
Living people
AHCA Division I men's ice hockey All-Americans
Canadian ice hockey goaltenders
Brown Bears men's ice hockey players
Hampton Aces players
Ice hockey people from Simcoe County
Philadelphia Flyers draft picks
Sportspeople from Barrie